Dirk Westphal (born January 31, 1986) is a German volleyball player, a member of Germany men's national volleyball team and Iranian club Shahrdari Tabriz VC, a gold medalist of European League 2009, a bronze medalist of the World Championship 2014.

Personal life
Westphal was born in Berlin, Germany. He is a son of Rolf and Petra (née Brandwein). In the years 1996-2006 he attended the sports school Coubertin-Gymnasium in Berlin. Then he did his military service in Nienburg, Lower Saxony and in sports group of the Bundeswehr in Mitte. He has girlfriend and one child.

Career

National team
In 2014 played at World Championship 2014 held in Poland. Germany won the match for the bronze medal with France.

Sporting achievements

Clubs

National championships
 2007/2008  German Championship, with SCC Berlin
 2012/2013  Belgium Cup, with Knack Randstad Roeselare
 2012/2013  Belgium Championship, with Knack Randstad Roeselare

National team
 2009  European League
 2014  FIVB World Championship

References

External links
 Dirk Westphal at the International Volleyball Federation
 
 Dirk Westphal at PlusLiga

1986 births
Living people
Volleyball players from Berlin
German men's volleyball players
German expatriate sportspeople in Italy
Expatriate volleyball players in Italy
German expatriate sportspeople in Belgium
Expatriate volleyball players in Belgium
German expatriate sportspeople in Poland
Expatriate volleyball players in Poland
German expatriate sportspeople in France
Expatriate volleyball players in France
Czarni Radom players
German expatriate sportspeople in Iran
Expatriate volleyball players in Iran